The New York State Courts Electronic Filing System (NYSCEF) is the electronic court filing (e-filing) system used in the New York State Unified Court System. E-filing in criminal cases in the Supreme Court and County Court may be authorized by the Chief Administrative Judge, but it is unlawful for such documents to be made available to the public online through NYSCEF.

The judiciary's 2014–2015 budget request stated that the "expansion of electronic filing continues as a high priority", and stated that it launched a new website that permits the public to order criminal history searches for which it collects $92 million annually.

See also 
 CM/ECF
 California Court Case Management System
 MassCourts
 PACER

References

External links 
 New York State Courts Electronic Filing System
 "NYSCEF is a program that permits the filing of legal papers by electronic means with the County Clerk or appropriate court and offers electronic service of papers in those cases."
 Welcome to NYS Courts Electronic Filing (NYSCEF)
 "NYSCEF is a program that permits the filing of legal papers by electronic means with the County Clerk or appropriate court and offers electronic service of papers in those cases."
 Welcome to eCourts
 "Using our free case information services you can find future appearance dates for cases in Criminal and Family Courts. You may also view information on both active and disposed cases in Civil Supreme and Local Civil Courts, and by signing up for our eTrack case tracking service you can receive email updates and appearance reminders for Civil Supreme and Local Civil Court cases."
 eTrack - Login
 "eTrack is a case tracking service which enables you to track active Civil Supreme Court cases from all 62 counties of New York State, and cases from all currently available Local Civil and Criminal Courts."

New York Courts Emergency Alert Portal
 New York Courts Emergency Alert Portal
 The New York Courts Emergency Alert Portal provides users with critical, emergency related information and notifications regarding the New York State courts. These notices include updates on court closings, delayed openings, or other emergency conditions.

Excellence Initiative
 Excellence Initiative
 The Chief Judge wants to hear from members of the public, judges, jurors, litigants, attorneys and court employees for a detailed and comprehensive evaluation of current court processes and procedures to determine what is working well and what needs to be improved.

New York (state) state courts
Government databases in the United States
Online law databases